Pyropelta elongata is a species of small sea snail, a deep-water limpet, a marine gastropod mollusk in the family Pyropeltidae.

Distribution
This species occurs in South China Sea.

References

Pyropeltidae
Gastropods described in 2017